Mount Lincoln is a 5,868-foot-elevation (1,789 meter) mountain summit located in the Olympic Mountains, in Mason County of Washington state. It is situated on the boundary shared by Daniel J. Evans Wilderness and Mount Skokomish Wilderness, as well as the shared common border of Olympic National Park with Olympic National Forest. Lincoln is the second-highest point on Sawtooth Ridge, and the nearest higher neighbor is Mount Cruiser,  to the northeast. Lincoln has two sub-peaks: a North Peak (5,690 ft/1,734 m), and a Southwest Peak (5,486 ft/1,672 m). Flapjack Lakes lie immediately west below the north sub-peak. Topographic relief is significant as the summit rises over 5,100 feet (1,555 m) above the Staircase Ranger Station at Lake Cushman in approximately two miles. Precipitation runoff from the mountain drains into tributaries of the North Fork Skokomish River, and partly into Mildred Lakes, thence Hamma Hamma River.

Climate

Mount Lincoln is located in the marine west coast climate zone of western North America. Most weather fronts originate in the Pacific Ocean, and travel east toward the Olympic Mountains. As fronts approach, they are forced upward by the peaks of the Olympic Range, causing them to drop their moisture in the form of rain or snowfall (Orographic lift). As a result, the Olympics experience high precipitation, especially during the winter months. During winter months, weather is usually cloudy, but, due to high pressure systems over the Pacific Ocean that intensify during summer months, there is often little or no cloud cover during the summer. Because of maritime influence, snow tends to be wet and heavy, resulting in avalanche danger. The months May through October offer the most favorable weather for climbing or viewing.

History

It is unknown who named the mountain or nearby Lincoln Creek, but it's presumed to honor President Abraham Lincoln (1809–1865), the 16th president of the United States. In 1862 during the Civil War, President Lincoln by executive order designated the nearby townsite of Port Angeles for a military and naval reserve.

The peak was probably climbed in 1890 by an exploratory party of the Second O'Neil Expedition. As the sun was setting, they reached a summit and were overwhelmed by the grandeur of the country that stretched before them. Inspired by the view, botanist Louis Henderson described the view:

The first documented ascent of the summit was made in 1932 by Ken Soult and F.S. Harmon.

Climbing routes

Established scrambling routes on Mt. Lincoln:

 via the south ridge - 
 via Flapjack Lake and north ridge - class 3
 via Harniss Chute - class 3

Geology

The Olympic Mountains are composed of obducted clastic wedge material and oceanic crust, primarily Eocene sandstone, turbidite, and basaltic oceanic crust. The mountains were sculpted during the Pleistocene era by erosion and glaciers advancing and retreating multiple times.

See also

 Geology of the Pacific Northwest
 Olympic Mountains

References

External links

 Mt. Lincoln photo: Flickr
 
 Mount Skokomish Wilderness U.S. Forest Service

Olympic Mountains
Landforms of Mason County, Washington
Mountains of Washington (state)
Olympic National Forest
North American 1000 m summits
Olympic National Park